Caterina Saporiti Bondini (1757 – after 1791) was an Italian opera singer. She was engaged in the Estates Theatre in Prague from 1784 until 1791, where she performed important roles in operas by Mozart. By 1773, Caterina had married the impresario  and she was a popular soprano in her husband's company in the mid-1780s. The couple had five children, only two of whom lived to adulthood, among them the soprano  Caterina sang Susanna in the first Prague production of Le nozze di Figaro in early December 1786, and on 14 December a performance was given for her benefit.

References

Further reading
 Starší divadlo v českých zemích do konce 18. století. Osobnosti a díla [Older Theatre in the Czech Lands until the End of the 18th Century. Personalities and Works], ed. A. Jakubcová, Prague: Divadelní ústav [Theatre Institute] – Academia 2007 

1757 births
18th-century Italian women opera singers
18th-century Bohemian women opera singers
Date of birth unknown
Place of birth unknown
Year of death unknown
Date of death unknown
Italian operatic sopranos